Twist may refer to:

In arts and entertainment

Film, television, and stage 
 Twist (2003 film), a 2003 independent film loosely based on Charles Dickens's novel Oliver Twist
 Twist (2021 film), a 2021 modern rendition of Oliver Twist starring Michael Caine.
 The Twist (1976 film), a 1976 film co-written and directed by Claude Chabrol
 The Twist (1992 film), a 1992 documentary film directed by Ron Mann
 Twist (stage play), a 1995 stage thriller by Miles Tredinnick
 Twist, the main character on television series The Fresh Beat Band and its spin-off Fresh Beat Band of Spies
 Oliver Twist (disambiguation), name of several film, television, and musical adaptations based on Charles Dickens's novel Oliver Twist
 "Twist" (Only Murders in the Building), a 2021 episode of the TV series Only Murders in the Building
 Jack Twist, a character in the 2005 film Brokeback Mountain
 Twist Morgan, a character in the television series Spaced

Music 
 Twist (album), a 1994 album by New Zealand singer-songwriter Dave Dobbyn
 The Twist (album), a 1984 album by Danish indiepop band Gangway
 "The Twist" (song), a song by Hank Ballard, covered by Chubby Checker, a hit in 1960 
 "The Twist", a song from the album Grow Up and Blow Away by Metric
 "The Twist", a song from the album Coming Back Hard Again by hip hop band The Fat Boys
 "Twist" (Phish song), from the 2000 album Farmhouse by Phish
 "Twist" (Goldfrapp song), a single from the 2003 album Black Cherry by Goldfrapp
 Twist, an album by Chris & Cosey
 "Twist", a song from the album Unfinished Business by Nathan Sykes
"Twist" a song from the album A Hundred Days Off by Underworld
"Twist", the opener of the 1996 Korn album, Life Is Peachy
 "Twisting", a song from the album Flood by They Might Be Giants
 Twist (band), a rock band from Birmingham, England, UK

Other media 
 Twist ending, an unexpected conclusion or climax to a work of fiction
 Twist (magazine), an American teen magazine
 Twist (Cano novel), a novel by Harkaitz Cano
 Twist (Östergren novel), a novel by Klas Östergren
 Twist (TV network), an American television network
 Oliver Twist, a novel by Charles Dickens, and its main character

Finance
 Transaction Workflow Innovation Standards Team (TWIST), a non-profit financial industry standards group
 Operation Twist, an effort (in 1961, and again in 2011) by the U.S. Federal Reserve to lower long-term interest rates

Mathematics, science, and technology
 Twist (mathematics), a geometric quantity associated with a ribbon
 Twists of curves, a method of deriving related curves
 Twist (screw theory), in applied mathematics and physics
 Twist (software), a test automation solution by ThoughtWorks Studios
 Ellipse Twist, a French hang glider
 Twist fungus (Dilophospora alopecuri)
 Twisting properties, in statistics
 Twist transcription factor, a gene protein

People 
 Barry McGee (born 1966), also known as Twist, painter and graffiti artist
 Tony Twist (born 1968), Canadian hockey player
 Leroy "Twist" Casey (born 1973), disk jockey
 Liz Twist (born 1956), British Member of Parliament

Places 
 Twist, Arkansas, a city in the United States
 Twist, Germany, a municipality in Lower Saxony

Sport
 Aerial twist, an acrobatic maneuver in gymnastics
 Twist lifts, a type of lift in pairs figure skating

Other uses
 Twist (cocktail garnish), a decorative piece of citrus zest
 Twist (confectionery), a Norwegian bag of sweets, now produced in Sweden
 Twist (dance), a rock and roll dance 
 Twist (poker), a special round in some variants of stud poker
 Twist (ride), a popular amusement ride, often seen on travelling funfairs
 French twist (hairstyle), a hair styling technique
 Twist tobacco, a type of chewing tobacco
 Sail twist, a phenomenon in sailing
 Wing twist, a design choice in aeronautics

See also 
 Twisted (disambiguation)
 Twister (disambiguation)
 Torque